Dendrophidion bivittatus, commonly known as the forest racer, is a snake of the colubrid family.

Geographic distribution
The snake is found in Colombia, Ecuador and Peru.

References

Colubrids
Snakes of South America
Reptiles of Colombia
Reptiles of Ecuador
Reptiles of Peru
Reptiles described in 1854
Taxa named by Gabriel Bibron
Taxa named by André Marie Constant Duméril
Taxa named by Auguste Duméril